() is a German term that refers to the political truce between Germany's political parties during World War I. The trade unions refrained from striking, the Social Democratic Party (SPD) voted for war credits in the Reichstag, and the parties agreed not to criticize the government and its war.

The only member of parliament of any party to vote against war credits in the second session was Karl Liebknecht. In the third session on 20 March 1915, Otto Rühle joined him. Over the course of the war, the number of SPD politicians opposed to the war steadily increased. Their resistance against the  politics led to the expulsion of Liebknecht, Rosa Luxemburg, Clara Zetkin, and others from the SPD. These went on to found the Spartacus League, the Independent Social Democratic Party of Germany, and the Communist Party of Germany.

See also 
 Sacred Union
 Spirit of 1914

References

Further reading 
 
 
 
 

German Empire in World War I
Political history of Germany
Political terminology in Germany